Alla Misnik (27 August 1967 - 11 July 2006) was a Soviet artistic gymnast. At the age of fourteen, she won three medals at the 1981 European Championships - silver on uneven bars and floor exercise, and bronze in the all-around. She competed for the Soviet team from 1981 until 1983, but she never competed at a World Championships or an Olympic Games. She died of a stroke at the age of 38.

Competitive history

References

1967 births
2006 deaths
Soviet female artistic gymnasts
Ukrainian female artistic gymnasts
Sportspeople from Kharkiv